Max Urbini (July 17, 1924 — February 13, 2004) was a French football player, sports journalist and writer. 
 
In the middle of the 20th century he was one of the leading sports journalists of France, he worked in the newspaper L'Equipe, was a staff member and editor of the magazine France Football, as well as deputy chairman of the union of sports journalists of France. Author of several books about football and football players, including the collection of short stories  Football history  (in France was published in 1964 with a foreword by Just Fontaine).

References

External links
 France Football, toute l'actualité du football
 Max URBINI —  Josef MASOPUST —  Golden Ball

1924 births
2004 deaths
French footballers
French sports journalists

Association footballers not categorized by position